Dare Me is an American teen drama television series based on the 2012 novel of the same name by Megan Abbott, co-developed with Gina Fattore. The series was picked up in late January 2019 and premiered on USA Network on December 29, 2019. In April 2020, USA Network canceled the series after one season.

Premise
Dare Me follows the lives of competitive high school cheerleaders in a small Midwestern town. The cheerleaders become entangled in a series of dark secrets after their new coach Colette French takes over the squad.

Cast and characters

Main

Willa Fitzgerald as Coach Colette French, Sutton Grove High School's new cheerleading coach
Herizen Guardiola as Addy Hanlon, a cheerleader at Sutton Grove High School
Marlo Kelly as Beth Cassidy, Addy's best friend and the captain of the cheer squad until Coach French eliminates the position
Rob Heaps as Matt French, Colette's husband and a project manager at Eagle Investments who is working on Sutton Grove High School's new stadium
Zach Roerig as Sergeant Will Mosley, a local recruiter for the U.S. Marine Corps who is having an affair with Colette
Paul Fitzgerald as Bert Cassidy, Beth's estranged father and the president of a real estate company named Eagle Investments
Alison Thornton as Tacy Cassidy, Beth's half-sister, and a freshman cheerleader on Sutton Grove High School's squad

Recurring

 Antonio J. Bell as Michael Slocum, Addy's friend
 Amanda Brugel as Faith Hanlon, Addy's single mother who is a police officer
 Tammy Blanchard as Lana Cassidy, Beth's mother
 Tamberla Perry as J.J. Curtis, one of the local cheerleader boosters, and RiRi's mother
 Adrian Walters as Jimmy Tibbs
 Chris Zylka as Corporal Kurtz, a subordinate Marine recruiter of Will
 Taveeta Szymanowicz as RiRi Curtis, a fellow member of the cheerleading team, and Addy and Beth's friend, and J.J.'s daughter
 Brittany Raymond as Cori Ross, a fellow member of the cheerleading team
 Erika Prevost as Brianna Bradley, a fellow member of the cheerleading team

Episodes

Production

Development
On January 28, 2019, the production had been given a series order. The writer of the novel, Megan Abbott, is expected to executive produce alongside Gina Fattore, Peter Berg, Michael Lombardo, Sarah Condon, and Karen Rosenfelt. Production companies involved with the series were slated to include Universal Cable Productions and Film 44. On November 8, 2019, it was announced that the series would premiere on December 29, 2019. On April 30, 2020, the series was canceled after one season. However, Megan Abbott and Gina Fatore plan to shop the series to other networks.

Casting
On July 25, 2018, Willa Fitzgerald, Herizen Guardiola, and Marlo Kelly were cast in starring roles in the pilot. On August 14, 2018, Rob Heaps, Zach Roerig, and Paul Fitzgerald joined the main cast, while Joyful Drake, Tammy Blanchard, Antonio J. Bell, Alison Thornton, and Tamberla Perry were set to recur. On May 29, 2019, Chris Zylka and Taveeta Syzmanowicz were cast in recurring roles. On August 7, 2019, Adrian Walters and Amanda Brugel joined the cast in recurring capacities. Alison Thornton was promoted to series regular in the second episode of the first season.

Filming
Principal photography for the first season began on April 22, 2019 and concluded on August 6, 2019 in Toronto, Ontario, Canada.

Reception

Critical response
Dare Me received generally favorable reviews. On Rotten Tomatoes, the series holds an approval rating of 85% with an average rating of 7.3/10, based on 27 reviews from critics. The website's critical consensus reads, "Visceral, if at times vapid, Dare Me slow-burning thriller pairs nicely with its moody atmospherics to create a deft exploration of the interiority of teen life." On Metacritic, it has a weighted average score of 73 out of 100, based on 12 critics, indicating "generally favorable reviews".

Ratings

Notes

References

External links
 

2010s American high school television series
2010s American mystery television series
2010s American teen drama television series
2019 American television series debuts
2020 American television series endings
2020s American high school television series
2020s American mystery television series
2020s American teen drama television series
Adultery in television
American thriller television series
Cheerleading television series
English-language television shows
Television shows based on American novels
Television shows directed by Justin Tipping
Television shows directed by Steph Green
Television series about teenagers
Television series by Universal Content Productions
USA Network original programming